Francisco is an unincorporated community in northern Jackson County, Alabama, United States.

History
Francisco is named in honor of Francisco Rice, who served in the Confederate Army and as a member of the Alabama Senate. A post office operated under the name Francisco from 1875 to 1957.

References

Unincorporated communities in Alabama
Unincorporated communities in Jackson County, Alabama